Alexander Lee (also Leigh) (d. ca. 1503) was a Canon of Windsor from 1469 to 1480.

Career
He was King's Scholar at Eton College, then educated at King's College, Cambridge where he graduated BA, MA and LLD.

He was for some years the King's resident ambassador in Scotland.

He was appointed:
Rector of Fen Ditton, Cambridgeshire 1468 - 1473
Almoner to King Edward IV
Prebendary of York 1471 - 1501
Rector of St Bride's Church 1471 - 1485
Prebendary of Barneby, Howden, 1478
Prebendary of Ripon 1481 - 1491
Rector of Spofforth 1481 - 1499
Temporal Chancellor of Durham Cathedral 1490
Rector of Houghton-le-Spring 1490 - 1500
 
He was appointed to the eleventh stall in St George's Chapel, Windsor Castle in 1469 and held the canonry until 1480.

Notes 

1503 deaths
Canons of Windsor
People educated at Eton College
Alumni of King's College, Cambridge
Year of birth missing